Built in phases between 1984 and 1991, the Concourse at Landmark Center is a real estate development in metro Atlanta's Perimeter Center business district, in the city of Sandy Springs, Georgia, United States. It is a 70 acre planned community with two 34-story office towers, several low-rise office buildings, a hotel, and a health club, all set in landscaped grounds around a man-made lake.

Set at the northeastern corner of the junction of two of Atlanta's busiest highways (Interstate 285 and Georgia 400), the Concourse, with its blue glass towers, was a major addition to the Atlanta skyline for commuters traveling to and from the north side of suburban Atlanta. It houses several corporate headquarters, including those of Rayovac, CodeMettle, and Allconnect.

Description
Completed in 1988 and 1991, the 34-story towers are officially Concourse Corporate Center V and VI, but are known locally as "the King and Queen towers" because their white lattice crowns resemble the heads of chess pieces. The squared-top "king" tower (Corporate Center VI) is on the immediate east side of 400, the round arcs of the "queen" tower (Corporate Center V) are in turn immediately east of it.

The colored lights on the tops of the towers are occasionally changed to mark special occasions. For example, the Queen tower has been lit up in pink for Breast Cancer Month, and green in March to celebrate St. Patrick's Day. The towers were illuminated in purple in honor of Prince following his death in April 2016.

Redevelopment plans
In 2016, plans were submitted for a pedestrian-friendly mixed-use development which would act as an expansion to both Concourse at Landmark Center. Plans calls for a 5-story, 125-room boutique hotel connected to an existing parking structure at the intersection of Peachtree Dunwoody Road and Hammond Drive; a 5-story, 270-unit “high-end” apartment building atop a “concrete podium”; and 24,500 square feet of restaurant and retail space in three buildings. The apartment building would be built on a plat that is currently zoned for a four-story office building, which would have been a mirror-image of an existing structure adjacent to the site.

References

External links

 Emporis listing

Sandy Springs, Georgia
Buildings and structures in Fulton County, Georgia
Twin towers